Gray is a census-designated place (CDP) within the town of Gray, in Cumberland County, Maine, United States. The population was 884 at the 2010 census., comprising 11.4% of the town's population of 7,761.

Gray (CDP) consists largely of the center of the Town of Gray known as Gray Village.  It is part of the Portland–South Portland–Biddeford, Maine Metropolitan Statistical Area.

Geography

Demographics

Links
 Gray (DCP) Census Block Map
 2010 Maine Census Data
 Town of Gray official website
 Town of Gray, Maine

References

Census-designated places in Maine
Portland metropolitan area, Maine
Census-designated places in Cumberland County, Maine